The  opened in Uwajima, Ehime Prefecture, Japan in 1974. The collection focuses on the local branch of the Date clan, who from 1615 and the time of Date Hidemune were daimyō of the Uwajima Domain, and includes a Momoyama-period painting of Toyotomi Hideyoshi that has been designated an Important Cultural Property.

See also
 Uwajima City Historical Museum
 List of Historic Sites of Japan (Ehime)
 List of Cultural Properties of Japan - paintings (Ehime)
 Uwajima Castle

References

External links

  Uwajima City Date Museum

Museums in Ehime Prefecture
Uwajima, Ehime
Museums established in 1974
1974 establishments in Japan